Fußballsportverein Frankfurt 1899 e.V., commonly known as simply FSV Frankfurt, is a German association football club based in the Bornheim district of Frankfurt am Main, Hessen and founded in 1899. FSV Frankfurt also fielded a rather successful women's team, which was disbanded in 2006.

History
The club was one of the founding members of the Nordkreis-Liga in 1909, when football started to become more organised in Southern Germany. With the outbreak of the First World War in 1914, this league came to a halt but a championship for the region was still held, which FSV won in 1917.

After the war, the club became part of the Kreisliga Nordmain, which it managed to win in 1922–23, qualifying for the Southern German championship, where it finished last out of five teams.

The pinnacle of the team's achievement was a losing appearance in the 1925 national final, 0–1 to 1. FC Nürnberg, and the capture of a German amateur title in 1972 in a 2–1 victory over TSV Marl-Hüls. The club contested the final of the 1938 Tschammerpokal, predecessor of today's DFB-Pokal, but was beaten 1–3 by Rapid Vienna.

The club played in the Bezirksliga Main, then the Bezirksliga Main-Hessen throughout the 1920s and 1930s. After capturing the championship of the VSFV (Verband Süddeutscher Fussball Vereine or Federation of South German Football Clubs) in 1933, FSV went on to play in the Gauliga Südwest, one of sixteen top-flight divisions formed that same year in the re-organization of German football in the Third Reich. They consistently earned mid-table results there with the club's best finish being second place in 1939. In 1941 the Gauliga Hessen was split into the Gauliga Westmark and the Gauliga Hessen-Nassau with FSV playing in the latter division. The team finished a close second to Kickers Offenbach in 1943 and in 1944 merged briefly with SG Eintracht Frankfurt to play as the wartime side KSG (Kriegspielgemeinschaft) Frankfurt. The following season the Gauliga collapsed with the advance of Allied armies into Germany as World War II drew to a close.

After the war occupying Allied authorities ordered the dissolution of all organizations in Germany, including sports and football clubs. FSV was re-established as SG Bornheim but had taken on their old identity again by late 1945. The team resumed play in the first division Oberliga Süd where they played undistinguished, middling football until relegated at the end of the 1961–62 season. The Bundesliga, Germany's first top-flight professional league, was formed in 1963. FSV joined the Regionalliga Süd and remained a regular tier II side from the early 1960s through to the early 1970s when they slipped to the third tier. The club returned to the second tier in 1975 a year after the formation of the 2. Bundesliga, playing in the 2. Bundesliga Süd. In 1981 the northern and southern divisions of this league were combined and as a perennial lower table side FSV was delivered to the third division Oberliga Hessen (III). The club made a single season cameo appearance in the combined league in 1982–83 before once again falling back.

They played in the Regionalliga Süd (III) in 2007–08 after seven seasons in the Amateur Oberliga Hessen (IV). Winning the championship of the Regionalliga Süd (III), for the 2008–09 season the club was promoted to the 2. Bundesliga, where it played for eight seasons with moderate success before relegation to the 3. Liga at the end of the 2015–16 season.

Reserve team

The club's reserve team, the FSV Frankfurt II, rose for the first time above local Hesse level in 2010 when it won the Hessenliga and was promoted to the Regionalliga Süd. After two seasons, this league was disbanded in 2012 and FSV II became part of the new Regionalliga Südwest. It was relegated to the Hessenliga in 2013 and disbanded the following year after a rule change which meant professional clubs did not have to have a reserve side any more, something that previously had been compulsory.

Frankfurt derby
The 2011–12 season saw FSV Frankfurt play city rivals Eintracht Frankfurt in a league match for the first time in almost 50 years. The last league game between the two had been played on 27 January 1962, then in the Oberliga Süd. For the first of the two matches, FSV's home game on 21 August 2011, the decision was made to move to Eintracht's stadium as FSV's Volksbankstadion only holds less than 11,000 spectators and in excess of 40,000 spectators were expected to attend the game.

Honours

League
 German football championship
 Runners-up: 1925
 Southern German championship
 Champions: 1933
 German amateur champions
 Champions: 1972
 Nordkreis-Liga (I)
 Champions: 1917
 Runners-up: 1911, 1916, 1918
 Kreisliga Nordmain (I)
 Champions: 1923
 Runners-up: 1920
 Bezirksliga Main (I)
 Champions: 1924, 1925, 1926, 1927
 Bezirksliga Main-Hessen (I)
 Champions: 1933
 2. Oberliga Süd (II)
 Champions: 1963
 Oberliga Hessen (III-IV)
 Champions: 1969, 1973, 1975, 1982, 1994, 1998, 2007, 2010‡
 Runners-up: 1993, 2002, 2005, 2006
 Verbandsliga Hessen-Süd (VI)
 Champions: 2009‡

Cup
 German Cup
 Runners-up: 1938
 Hesse Cup (Tiers III-VII)
 Winners: 1990
 Runners-up: 1982, 1986, 2006, 2020

 ‡ Won by reserve team.

Recent seasons
The recent season-by-season performance of the club:

 With the introduction of the Regionalligas in 1994 and the 3. Liga in 2008 as the new third tier, below the 2. Bundesliga, all leagues below dropped one tier.

Players

Current squad

Former players

  Alexander Opoku
  Zsolt Kalmár
  Ehsan Hajsafi

Staff

Sports
 Head Coach: Thomas Brendel
 Assistant Coach: TBA
 Goalkeeping Coach : Marcel Richter
 Athletics Coach : Michelle Hürzeler

Recent managers
Recent managers of the club:

Women's department
The women's team won three championships and five cups, even completing a double in 1995, but was retired after the 2005–06 season due to financial weakness. In its time FSV had many German top football players, including national record scorer Birgit Prinz, who left in 1998 for local rival 1. FFC Frankfurt.

Honours
 German Championship: 1986, 1995, 1998
 DFB-Pokal winner: 1985, 1990, 1992, 1995, 1996

Notable past players

The following players who have played for Frankfurt have been capped for Germany at least 50 times:
 Birgitt Austermühl
 Steffi Jones
 Sandra Minnert
 Birgit Prinz
 Sissy Raith
 Sandra Smisek
 Britta Unsleber

Other sports departments
As a sports club FSV has had at various times departments for athletics, boxing, darts, handball, ice hockey, and tennis.

References

External links
 Official website 
 FSV Frankfurt at Weltfussball.de 
 Das deutsche Fußball-Archiv  historical German domestic league tables

 
Football clubs in Germany
Football clubs in Frankfurt
Association football clubs established in 1899
1899 establishments in Germany
Frauen-Bundesliga clubs
2. Bundesliga clubs
3. Liga clubs